The 1982 Southeastern Conference baseball tournament was held at Perry Field in Gainesville, Florida, from May 14 through 16.  won their second consecutive tournament and earned the Southeastern Conference's automatic bid to the 1982 NCAA Tournament.

Regular season results

Tournament

All-Tournament Team

See also 
 College World Series
 NCAA Division I Baseball Championship
 Southeastern Conference baseball tournament

References 

 SECSports.com All-Time Baseball Tournament Results
 Boydsworld 1982 Standings
 SECSports.com All-Tourney Team Lists

Tournament
Southeastern Conference Baseball Tournament
Southeastern Conference baseball tournament
Southeastern Conference baseball tournament
College baseball tournaments in Florida
Baseball competitions in Gainesville, Florida